The Jacksonville mayoral election of 2011 determined the Mayor of Jacksonville, Florida. A blanket primary with six candidates together on the same ballot took place March 22, 2011. As no candidate received a majority of the vote, a runoff election between the top two vote-getters, Republican Mike Hogan and Democrat Alvin Brown, took place on May 17, 2011. In a close race, Brown defeated Hogan to become Jacksonville's first African-American mayor.

The runoff saw Brown win the narrowest election in Jacksonville mayoral history. Brown had widely been considered an underdog.

General election

Runoff election

References

2011 Florida elections
Government of Jacksonville, Florida
2011 United States mayoral elections
2011